After Burner Complete is a video game developed by Rutubo Games and Sega, and published by Sega for the 32X.

Gameplay
After Burner Complete is a version of the After Burner arcade flight simulator developed for the 32x.

Reception

Next Generation reviewed the game, rating it three stars out of five, and stated that "for a taste of nostalgia, Afterburner comes up with the (albeit ludicrously overpriced) goods."

Reviews
GameFan Magazine - April 1995
Video Games & Computer Entertainment - May 1995
GamePro - March 1995
Mean Machines - March 1995

References

1995 video games
Sega 32X games